Park Tae-joon (October 24, 1927 – December 13, 2011) was a South Korean business tycoon, war hero, political leader, and philanthropist.

His most renowned accomplishment includes founding of POSCO and growing it into one of the world's largest and most successful steel companies during his multi-decade tenure as Chairman and CEO. For this, he was often called the "Korean Andrew Carnegie". Earlier in his life, he served in the South Korean Army and led several platoons during the Korean War and eventually reaching the rank of Major General. He also founded POSTECH (leading research university in Korea), the Pohang Steelers soccer team, and the POSCO TJ Park Foundation. As a politician, he served for four months as Prime Minister of South Korea. His pen name was Chungam.

Biography

Early years 
He was born on October 24, 1927 in Busan. When he was six years old, he moved to Japan where his father was working, but returned to his homeland following Korea's independence.

Education 
Whilst in Japan he entered the University of Waseda, but returned to Korea without graduating. Following his return he studied at the Korea Military Academy and became a 6th Graduate, followed by a time of study at National Defense University Graduate School.

He and other Korean military officers completed a bachelor's degree in a four-year standard university as required by the government. They had served in the army without completing a standard degree course after the liberation and it was the government's measure to build the Korea Military Academy (then called the South Korea Guard Academy) for officers to have a standard degree course (after 11th graduation).
The government had noticed that they needed a commissioned education for officers to have bachelor's degree course in government level. The degree awarded from Dankook University is the only one which is acknowledged by Korea.

Military service 

In 1948, Park graduated from the Korea Military Academy and was then commissioned as shavetail. He was awarded the Chungmu Order of Military Merit and the Hwarang order of military merit after participating in the Korean War.
He did not take part in May 16 coup, but entrusted his family in case of failing Park Chung-hee.

After the coup, he became a member of commerce[trade] and industry in Nation re-building supreme council and had a part in the first five-year Korea economic development plan.

In 1963, Park was discharged as a Major General.

He was awarded the Chungmu Order of Military Merit (1950, 1952), the Hwarang order of military merit (1951, 1953, 1954), the Order of Civil Merit, the Rose of Sharon Medal (1974), the order of the Legion of Honor(1990), the Norway order of military merit (1991). After his death, he was conferred posthumous honors of the Ching[Manchu] dynasty presented merit. He was granted an honorary engineering doctorate degree from Carnegie Mellon University, The University of Sheffield, Birmingham University, and The University of Waterloo. He was also granted an honorary doctorate in economics from M.V. in Russia.

Commercial life 

After he transferred to the first reserve, he became the president of TaeguTec in 1964. One year later, the company turned around from deficit. To this day, TaeguTec is one of the only Korean companies that Warren Buffett has invested in. He became the president of Posco in April 1968. 10 years later, POSCO was a global company, and by 2010 was the world's third largest steelmaker.

Political activities 

In 1980, Park entered the political world because of the possibility of being appointed as the first member of the Nation Preservation Legislation Council. He was elected to be the 11th member of the National Assembly under the Democratic Justice Party and he served as a director of the finance committee in the National Assembly. After three similar parties were merged, he became chairman of the Democratic Liberal Party.

Park resigned as president of POSCO in October 1992. In the beginning of POSCO's establishment, Park used it to protect himself from political draft. He laid down the president position right after the establishment of a new government of discord with Kim Young-Sam and his government. He submitted a letter of resignation in October of 5th, 1992.
Park's honorary president rejected the position of election task force from Kim Young-Sam's Democratic Liberal Party. On the same day, POSCO had an emergency board meeting to reverse his decision of resignation from POSCO.

Discord with Kim Young-Sam caused Park to resign from his position in the National Assembly. Park wandered from place to place abroad because he was suspected of taking about 3.9 billion from POSCO sub-venders. There was a widespread doubt that there was to be any targeted investigation of him. In 1997, he successfully came back and was elected as a member of the National Assembly in Buk-gu Pohang by blaming President Kim for the economic failure.

He became the chairman of the Liberal Democratic Party, then supported Kim Dae Joong for the 15th presidency with Kim Jong Pil. He took office as the chairman in the government of Kim Dae Joong in 2000, but he resigned his spot because the government wrongfully accused him of property fraud. The accusations were later found to be false by a Korean court. In his later years he participated in awarding the Chungam prize every year.

Awards and achievements

Awards 

According to authorities of POSCO, “The National Commission give an award to Park Taejoon for contributing to national development.”

The National commission also remade 6 out of his 7 medals (2 Chungmugong medals, 3 Hwarangmugong medals, Mugunghwa medal, Gumtap-industry medal) as a memorial to him. The National Commission placed 6 remade medals except for Gumtap-industry medal at the mortuary during his funeral.

He was awarded the Bessemer Gold Medal by the Institute of Metals in 1987.

Achievements

Successful management of POSCO 

According to Japan's Mitsubishi Research Institute, POSCO was able to succeed as a leader in promoting venture leadership and insight. Chairman Park Taejoon has demonstrated sufficient commitment to the creation of Harvard Business School and Seoul National University. The major factor in the success of POSCO is "outstanding leadership of President Park Taejoon". In addition, in a Stanford Business School study released a report that called the "outstanding leadership of President TJ Park" critical to the development of South Korea. He created apartment complexes for the employees of POSCO, while paying more attention to the composition of the highest level of housing complexes, including preschool for children was established.

Contributions to education 
He established Pohang University of Science and Technology in 1986. In 1971 he established the POSCO Scholarship Foundation. Its goal was to expand the existing "Taejoon Park Foundation", launched in September 2005. It worked to promote cooperation in Asia, next-generation human resource development, and participation and sharing of practice Republic of Korea under the three strategies Asia uses to promote business. On June 16, 2008, the Board of Directors at POSCO Center selected Park Taejoon as president of the foundation. POSTECH (Pohang University of Science and Technology) has been awarded scholarships each year in recognition of its founder's contributions to the development of Park Taejoon Prize.

American Metal Market Steel Hall of Fame 
In 2011 Tae-joon was inducted into the inaugural class of the American Metal Market Steel Hall of Fame (http://www.amm.com/HOF-Profile/ParkTaejoon.html) for his substantial role in turning South Korea into one of the most industrialized nations on earth.

Personal life

The tie with steel 

Park Taejoon went to Lyamabuk Middle School. He was mobilized into steel manufacture service during the second world war. It was his first encounter with steel. At that time, the director of the workplace noticed that he had a talent for the sintering process.

Relationship with Park Chung-hee 

The relationship with Park Chung-hee (3rd President of South Korea) started from 1947 when they were in the military. Junghui Park, who was a company commander and also an instructor of ballistics, carefully observed Park Taejoon's behavior because he was good at mathematics and followed his own strict rules. He had become distant from Junghui Park since his graduation. Their relationship started again 10 years later when he had worked in the Headquarters of the Army as a colonel. At the same time, Junghui Park had been assigned as a commander of logistics support base asked Park Taejoon to assist him as the chief of staff.
In spring of 1961, Park Chung-hee had prepared a military coup, which is well known as the 5.16 military coup, with some officers. Many commanders, including Jongpil Kim participated in the 5.16 military coup.
Two months after the success of 5.16 military coup, Park Chung-hee assigned Park Taejoon as a chief secretary of chairman on nation reconstruction council. In September, Park Chung-hee assigned him as a chief member of commerce and industry division on nation reconstruction council. Park Taejoon had always accompanied Park Chung-hee on every business trip.
In 1963, Taejoon Park and Junghui Park became civilians. Since Junghui Park had taken part in politics, many commanders who had followed him had also taken part in politics, except Taejoon Park who turned to be a businessman. At the end of this year, Taejoon Park was assigned CEO of the Korean Tungsten. He had changed the company from deficit to surplus. In 1967, Park Taejoon got special command to establish Pohang Iron & Steel Co. from president Junghui Park and was assigned as CEO of Pohang Iron & Steel Co. in 1978.
After the Death of president Junghui Park, Park Taejoon volunteered to be the guardian of the son of president Park, Jiman Park. Park Taejoon supported him when he tried to take over Samyang Industries.

Relationship with Seung-duk Koh 

In 1984, Koh Seung-duk(고승덕) married Park Yooah(박유아) who is a second daughter of Park Tae-jun, Chairman of the once ruling Liberal Democrats(자민련), and previous CEO of POSCO. Park Yooah(박유아) majored in Fine Art at Ewha Womans University. After graduation, she studied art history and drawing in the United States with Koh Seung-duk(고승덕). They had their first child, Candy Koh, in 1987. When Tae-jun Part died in 2011, Koh Seung-duk(고승덕) visited the Yonsei University Severance Hospital to condole the late Park Taejoon. At that time, he said about the deceased, “He really was a great person, concerned about only big things of the nation” and he also said “Seriously, he is a tycoon of the times in Korea”

Friendship and camaraderie 

Park Taejoon liked people and usually got along with ex-president Chun Doohwan, ex-president Roh Moohyun, and prime minister Kim Jongpil. In finance, he was close with Samsung's Lee Byungchul, Hyundai's Chung Ju-yung, Samsung Electronics Chairman Lee Kun Hee, the honorary chairman of SK Telecom Son Gilseung, former Daewoo Group Chairman Kim Woojung, and also writer Jo Jungrae.

In 2011 he was treated for breathing difficulties, and hospitalized on December 13, 2011 in Yonsei Hospital. He died at the age of 84 after taking a serious turn. Although he got lung treatment at Cornell Hospital in 2001, he continued to suffer from after effects. Also, he left a will, in which he stated his hope for POSCO to grow as a power of national industry.

He was buried in the national cemetery. He outlived his parents Bong Gwan.Park and So Soon.Kim, but was survived by his spouse Ock Ja.Jang, their children, and grandchildren.

In popular culture 
 Portrayed by Choi Soo-jong and Kim Kwon in the 2014 TV Chosun's television series Into the Flames.

References 

1927 births
2011 deaths
South Korean military personnel of the Korean War
Prime Ministers of South Korea
South Korean chairpersons of corporations
South Korean company founders
Honorary Companions of the Order of Australia
Korea Military Academy alumni
Waseda University alumni
POSCO Group people
20th-century South Korean businesspeople
21st-century South Korean businesspeople
Members of the National Assembly (South Korea)
Bessemer Gold Medal
Converts to Protestantism from Buddhism